Young Lions may refer to:

Music, film, and print
 Young Lions (album), a 1990 album by Adrian Belew
 Young Lions (TV series), a 2002 Australian police drama
 Young Lions (book), a 2010 graphic novel by Blaise Larmee
 The Young Lions, a 1948 novel by Irwin Shaw
 The Young Lions (album), a 1960 jazz recording
 The Young Lions (film), a 1958 American film based upon the novel of the same name

Other
 Young Lions Competition, for young advertising professionals, part of the Cannes Lions International Festival of Creativity
 Young Lions FC, a Singapore under-23 football team
 Young lion, a professional wrestling term for a rookie wrestler
 Professional wrestlers under development by New Japan Pro-Wrestling
 Young Lion Cup, a professional wrestling tournament promoted by New Japan Pro-Wrestling

See also 
 Young Lions & Old Tigers, a 1995 studio album by American jazz pianist Dave Brubeck